Pranas is a Lithuanian masculine given name. It is a cognate of the English language name Frank. People with the name Pranas include:
Pranas Čepėnas (1899–1980), Lithuanian historian, encyclopedist, journalist and lexicographer
Pranas Domšaitis (1880–1965), Lithuanian painter
Pranas Dovydaitis (1886-1942), Lithuanian politician, former Prime Minister of Lithuania
Pranas Giedrimas, Lithuanian sport shooter
Pranas Končius (1911–1965), Lithuanian anti-Soviet partisan
Pranas Kūris (born 1938), Lithuanian lawyer, judge and ambassador
Pranas Lesauskis (1900–1942), Lithuanian soldier, management specialist and mathematician
Pranas Lubinas also known as Frank Lubin (1910–1999), Lithuanian-born American basketball player and Olympic medalist
Pranas Mažeika (1917–2010), Lithuanian basketball player
Pranas Morkūnas (1900–1941), Lithuanian translator and Dadaist poet
Pranas Skardžius (1899–1975), Lithuanian linguist 
Pranas Talzūnas also known as Frank Talzunas (1913–1984), American-born Lithuanian basketball player
Pranas Vaičaitis (1876–1901), Lithuanian poet 
Pranas Vilkas (born 1936), Lithuanian politician

References

Lithuanian masculine given names